Barland is a surname. Notable people with the surname include:

Ragnhild Barland (1934–2015), Norwegian politician
Thomas H. Barland (born 1930), American lawyer, politician, and judge

See also
 Balland
 Barland Castle, Wales
 Garland (surname)